77: The Year of Punk and New Wave (Helter Skelter Publishing, 2006) is a book by Henrik Poulsen that catalogues every punk rock band to have made a recording in the United Kingdom during the punk era. The book has about 200 entries starting with Acme Sewage Company and ending with the Zeros.

References

External links
 WorldCat book entry

2006 non-fiction books
Music guides
Books about rock music
New wave music
British music history